Fernanza Burgess (March 6, 1960 – January 27, 2012) was an American football wide receiver. He played in the National Football League (NFL) for the Miami Dolphins and New York Jets in 1984.

References

1960 births
2012 deaths
American football wide receivers
Morris Brown Wolverines football players
Miami Dolphins players
New York Jets players
People from Miami
Players of American football from Florida
Players of American football from Miami